Klahowya may refer to:
 Klahowya (sternwheeler), a sternwheel steamer
 Klahowya Secondary School, Silverdale, Washington
 MV Klahowya, an Evergreen State Class ferry